Ardian Dashi (born 8 August 1975) is an Albanian former footballer who played as a defender. He made one appearance for the Albania national team in 1994.

References

External links
 

1975 births
Living people
Albanian footballers
Association football defenders
Albania international footballers
KF Teuta Durrës players
KS Lushnja players
SC Verl players
SV Wehen Wiesbaden players
Eintracht Frankfurt II players
VFC Plauen players
FK Dinamo Tirana players
SpVgg Bayern Hof players
Albanian expatriate footballers
Albanian expatriate sportspeople in Germany
Expatriate footballers in Germany